Steff is a given name which can be male or female or a shortened form of Stephan or Stephanie. Notable people with the name include:

Steff Fontaine
Steff Frost
Steff Gaulter

See also
 Stef
 Steffl

de:Mihaela Șteff
fr:Steff
nl:Mihaela Şteff